Lalabad-e Seyyed Jafari (also Romanized as La‘lābād-e Seyyed Ja‘farī) is a village in Mahidasht Rural District, Mahidasht District, Kermanshah County, Kermanshah Province, Iran. At the 2006 census, its population was 294, in 63 families.

References 

Populated places in Kermanshah County